On 15 June 1944, United States Marine and Army forces landed on the southwest coast of the island of Saipan in the central Marianas chain. US forces declared Saipan secure on 9 July. 

Marine Corps forces landed on the nearby island of Tinian on 24 July. Tinian was declared secure 1 August. 

The naval forces involved can be summarized as follows:

 Combat ships: 7 escort carriers, 7 old battleships, 6 heavy cruisers, 5 light cruisers, 69 destroyers, 28 destroyer escorts
 150+ amphibious landing and support ships
 85+ auxiliaries

Command structure 

The roles of Commander in Chief, Pacific Ocean Areas (CINCPOA) and Commander in Chief, U.S. Pacific Fleet (CINCPAC), were both exercised by Admiral Chester W. Nimitz from his headquarters at Pearl Harbor, Hawaii.

Theater and Operational Command 
Since the Marianas lie in the Central Pacific, their capture was the responsibility of the U.S. Fifth Fleet, led by Vice Admiral Raymond A. Spruance from aboard his flagship, heavy cruiser Indianapolis.

The ships and embarked troops of Operation Forager were under direct operational command of Rear Admiral Richmond Kelly Turner aboard amphibious command ship Rocky Mount.

The Marine and Army landing forces for Operation Forager were under the command of Maj. Gen. Holland M. "Howlin' Mad" Smith, USMC. Smith directed the ground troops from aboard Vice Adm. Turner's flagship Rocky Mount until the afternoon of 17 June when he set up his command post ashore.

Ground Troops 
V Amphibious Corps (Maj. Gen. Holland M. Smith, USMC)
 Saipan: 2nd Marine Division (Maj. Gen. Thomas E. Watson)
   4th Marine Division (Maj. Gen. Harry Schmidt)
 27th Infantry Division (Army) (Maj. Gen. Ralph C. Smith)
 Tinian: 2nd Marine Division (Maj. Gen. Thomas E. Watson)
 4th Marine Division (Maj. Gen. Harry Schmidt)

Forces afloat 

U.S. Fifth Fleet
Admiral Raymond A. Spruance in heavy cruiser Indianapolis

Joint Expeditionary Force (Task Force 51)
Vice Admiral Richmond Kelly Turner in amphibious command ship Rocky Mount

 Northern Attack Force (Task Force 52 – Saipan and Tinian)
 Vice Admiral Turner

 Southern Attack Force (Task Force 53 – Guam)
 Vice Admiral Richard L. Conolly in amphibious command ship Appalachian

Combat Task Groups

Carrier Support Group One (Task Group 52.14) 

Rear Adm. Gerald F. Bogan
Unit 1 (Rear Adm. Bogan)
 2 escort carriers
 Fanshaw Bay (Capt. D.P. Johnson)
 Composite Squadron 68 (Lt. Cmdr. R.S. Rogers):
 16 FM-2 Wildcat fighters
 12 TBM Avenger torpedo bombers
 Midway (Capt. F.J. McKenna)
 Composite Squadron 65 (Lt. Cmdr. R.M. Jones):
 12 FM-2 Wildcat fighters
   9 TBM Avenger torpedo bombers
 3 destroyers (all Fletcher-class): Cassin Young, Irwin, Ross
Unit 2 (Capt. A.O. Weller)
 2 escort carriers
 White Plains (Capt. Weller)
 Composite Squadron 4 (Lt. Cmdr. R.C. Evins (KIA)):
 16 FM-2 Wildcat fighters
   3 TBF, 9 TBM Avenger torpedo bombers
 Kalinin Bay (Capt. C.R. Brown)
 Composite Squadron 3 (Lt. Cmdr. W.H. Keighley):
 14 FM-2 Wildcat fighters
   9 TBM Avenger torpedo bombers
 3 destroyers (all Fletcher-class): Porterfield, Callaghan, Longshaw

Carrier Support Group Two (Task Group 52.11) 

Rear Adm. H.B. Sallada
 Unit 3 (Rear Adm. Sallada)
 2 escort carriers
 Kitkun Bay (Capt. J.P. Whitney)
 Composite Squadron 5 (Cmdr. R.L. Fowler):
 12 FM-2 Wildcat fighters
   8 TBM Avenger torpedo bombers	
 Gambier Bay (Capt. H.H. Goodwin)
 Composite Squadron 10 (Lt. Cmdr. E.J. Huxtable):
 16 FM-2 Wildcat fighters
 12 TBM Avenger torpedo bombers
 3 destroyers (all Fletcher-class): Laws, Morrison, Benham
 Unit 4 (Rear Adm. Felix B. Stump)
 1 escort carrier
 Nehenta Bay (Capt. H.B. Butterfield)
 Composite Squadron 11 (Lt. Cmdr. O.B. Stanley): 
 12 FM-2 Wildcat fighters
   9 TBM Avenger torpedo bombers
 3 destroyers (all Fletcher-class): Bullard, Kidd, Chauncey

Fire Support Group One (Task Group 52.17) 

Rear Adm. Jesse B. Oldendorf
Unit 1 (Rear Admiral Howard F. Kingman):
 2 old battleships: Tennessee (Capt. A.D. Mayer), California  (Capt. H.P. Burnett)
 1 heavy cruiser: Indianapolis (Capt. E.R. Johnson)
 1 light cruiser: Birmingham (Capt. T.B. Inglis)
 4 destroyers (all Fletcher-class): Remey, Wadleigh, Norman Scott, Mertz
Unit 2 (Cmdr. P.H. Fitzgerald):
 3 destroyers (2 Fletcher-class): Robinson, Albert W. Grant, (1 Benson-class): Bailey
Unit 3 (Capt. H.P. Jarrett):
 3 destroyers (2 Fletcher-class): Halsey Powell, Monssen, (1 Benson-class): Coghlan
Unit 4 (Rear Adm. Oldendorf):
 2 old battleships: Maryland (Rear Adm. T.D. Ruddock), Colorado (Capt. W. Granat)
 1 heavy cruiser: Portland (Capt. S.H. Hurt)
 4 destroyers (all Fletcher-class): McDermut, McGowan, McNair, Melvin
Unit 5 (Rear Adm. R.W. Hayler):
 2 light cruisers: Montpelier (Capt. H.D. Hoffman), Cleveland  (Capt. A.G. Shepard)
 3 destroyers (all Fletcher-class): Yarnall, Twining, Stockham

Fire Support Group Two (Task Group 52.10) 

Rear Adm. Walden L. Ainsworth
Unit 6 (Rear Adm. Ainsworth)
 2 old battleships: Pennsylvania (Capt. C.F. Martin), Idaho (Capt. H.D. Clarke)
 1 light cruiser: Honolulu  (Capt. H.R. Thurber)
 3 destroyers (all Fletcher-class): Anthony, Wadsworth, Hudson
 1 high-speed transport: Dickerson
 1 high-speed minesweeper: Hogan
 1 seaplane tender: Williamson
Unit 7 (Rear Adm. George L. Weyler)
 1 old battleship: New Mexico (Capt. E.M. Zacharias)
 2 heavy cruisers: Minneapolis (Capt. Harry Slocum), San Francisco (Capt. H.E. Overesch)
 3 destroyers (all Fletcher-class): Halford, Terry, Braine
 1 high-speed transport: Talbot
 1 high-speed minesweeper: Stansbury
Unit 8 (Rear Adm. C. Turner Joy)
 2 heavy cruisers: Wichita (Capt. J.J. Mahoney), New Orleans (Capt. J.E. Hurff)
 1 light cruiser: St. Louis (Capt. R.H. Roberts)
 3 destroyers (all Fletcher-class): Fullam, Guest, Bennett

Amphibious Operations Task Groups

Control Group (Task Group 52.6) 
Commodore P.S. Theiss
 14 submarine chasers
 25 landing craft infantry
 3 high-speed transports

Transport Group "Able" (Task Group 52.3) 
Capt. H.B. Knowles
Embarking  2nd Marine Division
 Transport Division 18 (Capt. Knowles)
 2 attack transports: Monrovia, Frederick Funston
 1 transport: War Hawk 
 1 attack cargo ship: Alcyone
 1 landing ship dock: Lindenwald
Transport Division 10 (Capt. G.D. Morrison)
 4 attack transports: Clay, Neville, Arthur Middleton, Feland
 1 attack cargo ship: Alhena
 2 cargo ship: Jupiter, Hercules
Transport Division 28 (Capt. H.C. Flanagan)
 3 attack transports: Bolivar, Doyen, Sheridan
 1 transport: Comet 
 1 attack cargo ship: Electra
 1 landing ship dock: Oak Hill

Transport Group "Baker" (Task Group 52.4) 
Capt. D.W. Loomis
Embarking  4th Marine Division
Transport Division 20 (Capt. Loomis)
 3 attack transports: Leonard Wood, Pierce, James O'Hara
 1 transport: La Salle 
 1 attack cargo ship: Thuban
 1 landing ship dock: Ashland
Transport Division 26 (Capt. R.E. Hanson)
 3 attack transports: Callaway, Sumter, Leon
 1 transport: Storm King
 1 attack cargo ship: Almaack
 2 landing ship docks: White Marsh, Belle Grove
Transport Division 30 (Capt. C.A. Misson)
 3 attack transports: Knox, Calvert, Fuller
 2 transports: John Land, George F. Elliot
 1 attack cargo ship: Bellatrix

Eastern Landing Group (Task Group 52.8) 
Cmdr. C.J. McWhinnie
Embarking 1st Battalion, 2nd Marines
Transport Division 12 (Cmdr. McWhinnie)
 6 high-speed transports: Waters, Stringham, Goldsborough, Manley, Overton, Noa

Transport Screen (Task Group 52.12) 
Capt. R.E. Libby
 15 destroyers:
 7 Fletcher-class: Newcomb, Bennion, Heywood L. Edwards, Bryant, Prichett, Cony, Renshaw
 2 Porter-class: Phelps, Selfridge
 1 Mahan-class: Conyngham 
 2 Bagley-class: Bagley, Patterson
 1 Sampson-class: Shaw
 2 Wickes-class: Philip, Mugford 
 1 high-speed transport: Kane
 4 patrol craft escorts: 1396, 1404, 1457, 1460

Tractor Flotilla (Task Group 52.5) 
Capt. A.J. Robertson
Tractor Group "Able" (Capt. J.S. Lillard)
 Unit 1: 8 landing ship tanks
 Unit 2: 8 landing ship tanks
 "Able" Reserve: 6 landing ship tanks
Tractor Group "Baker" (Capt. Robertson)
 Unit 3: 8 landing ship tanks
 Unit 4: 8 landing ship tanks
 "Baker" Reserve: 4 landing ship tanks
 Support Artillery Group: 7 landing ship tanks

Minesweeping and Hydrographic Survey Group (Task Group 52.13) 
Cmdr. R.S. Moore, USNR
Unit 1 (Cmdr. W.R. Loud)
 4 high-speed minesweepers: Hopkins, Perry, Long, Hamilton
Unit 2 (Lt. Cmdr. H.L. Thompson)
 4 high-speed minesweepers: Chandler, Zane, Palmer, Howard
Unit 3 (Cmdr. Moore)
 3 minesweepers (all Auk-class): Chief, Champion, Herald
Unit 4 (Lt. Cmdr. J.R. Fels, USNR)
 3 minesweepers (all Auk-class): Oracle, Motive, Heed
Units 5 & 6 and Mobile Hydrographic Unit
 5 auxiliary motor minesweepers
 2 landing craft, control
 6 landing craft, vehicle

Joint Expeditionary Force Reserve (Task Group 51.1) 

Rear Adm. William H.P. Blandy
Embarking  27th Infantry Division (Army)
Transport Division 7 (Capt. C.G. Richardson)
 3 attack transports: Cavalier, J. Franklin Bell, Heywood 
 1 transport: Winged Arrow
 1 attack cargo ship: Fomalhaut
Transport Division 32 (Capt. M.O. Carlson)
 3 attack transports: Fremont, Harris, Custer
 1 transport: Herald of the Morning
 1 cargo ship: Auriga
 4 destroyers (all Fletcher-class): Waller, Pringle, Saufley, Sigourney
 2 destroyer escorts (both Evarts-class): Sederstrom, Fleming
 1 fleet tug: Chickasaw
Transport Division 34 (Capt. Charles Allen)
 4 transports: Prince Georges, Kenmore, De Grasse, Livingston
 1 cargo ship: Leonis
 7 landing craft infantry
Screen (Cmdr. J.R. Phal)
 2 destroyers (both Fletcher-class): Conway, Eaton
 4 destroyer escorts (2 Evarts-class): Tisdale, Eisele, (2 Cannon-class) Baron, Acree
 1 net layer: Mimosa
 1 net cargo ship: Keokuk

Service and Support Units

Service and Salvage Group (Task Group 52.7) 
Capt. S.E. Peck
 1 net layers: Cinchona
 3 fleet tugs: Tekesta, Tawasa, Molala
 1 repair ship: Phaon
 2 salvage vessels: Preserver, Clamp
 1 seaplane tender: Ballard
 1 landing craft repair ship: Agenor
 8 auxiliary motor minesweepers

 Fueling Group (Task Group 50.17) 
Capt. Edward E. Paré
 24 fleet oilers: Neshanic, Saugatuck, Saranac, Lackawanna, Monongahela, Neosho, Cimarron, Kaskaskia, Sabine, Caliente, Guadalupe, Platte, Pecos, Schuylkill, Tallulah, Ashtabula, Cahaba, Tappahannock, Kennebago, Marias, Suamico, Cache, Kankakee, Mascoma 8 destroyers (all Fletcher class): Paul Hamilton, Capps, John D. Henley, Hall, Evans, David W. Taylor, Halligan, Haraden14 destroyer escorts
 9 Cannon-class: Samuel S. Miles, Swearer, Bangust, Weaver, Riddle, Waterman, Lamons, Wesson, Hilbert 5 Evarts-class: Fair, Manlove, Mitchell, Whitman, Wileman 4 escort carriers: Copahee, Breton, Manila Bay, Natoma Bay 
 4 hospital ships: Relief, Solace, Bountiful, Samaritan''

Notes

References

Bibliography 
 
 

Naval units and formations of World War II
Pacific theatre of World War II
Amphibious operations involving the United States
Amphibious operations of World War II